Niramon Ounprom (nicknamed Koi; ,  born 26 January 1985) is an army officer, member of the Thai royal court, and a former Thai nurse. She was named concubine and a long-time mistress of Crown Prince Vajiralongkorn of Thailand, who granted her several military ranks and positions, including the noble name of Sineenat Wongvajirapakdi. After Prince Vajiralongkorn ascended the throne as King Rama X, he appointed her as his Royal Noble Consort, giving her the noble title of Chao Khun Phra ("royal noble consort") Sineenat Bilaskalayani in July 2019. She is the first woman to hold the title of a royal concubine of the King of Thailand in almost a century as the previous monarch was monogamous.

Early life and education
Sineenat was born on 26 January 1985, to the Ounprom family, Wirat (father) and Pranee (mother). Her place of birth is described as being in the Tha Wang Pha District of Nan Province, Thailand. Her primary and secondary schools were also in the same district, at Rajapiyorasa Yupparachanusorn School, and at Tha Wang Pha Pittayakhom (Witthayakhom) School. She went on to earn a bachelor's degree in nursing at the Royal Thai Army Nursing College in Bangkok in 2008 as a member of Class 41; Ounprom presented a published conference paper on smoking cessation efforts among enlisted soldiers while affiliated with her college.

Career
According to Sineenat's official court biography and other sources, from 2008 to 2012, Sineenat—then known by her earlier name, Niramon Ounprom—worked as a nurse at Phramongkutklao Hospital, and at an army hospital, the Ananda Mahidol Hospital.

Ounprom is described in her official biography as having risen to the rank of colonel by 2015, and as having "enrolled in the Ratchawallop Police Retainers, the Royal King’s Guards 904". Prior to this, Ounprom completed military training in parachuting, royal bodyguarding, and the Thai army's "Combat Qualifying Course in Jungle Warfare". She holds a private pilot's license following training in Germany and flight school in 2018 with the Thai Air Force. As of May 2019, she held the rank of major general.

Royal consort 
After Prince Vajiralongkorn ascended the throne as King Rama X, he appointed her as his Royal Noble Consort, giving her the noble title of Chao Khun Phra ("royal noble consort") Sineenat Bilaskalayani in July 2019. In August 2019, a biography with 60 photos of Chao Khun Phra Sineenat, posted on the website of the Bureau of the Royal Household, was so frequently accessed that it caused the website to crash.

On 30 August 2019, as Sineenat (Sininat or Sinina), she was appointed deputy adviser of a prison reform initiative, "Sharing Happiness And Doing Good With Heart With the Department of Corrections".

Downfall and restoration 
On 21 October 2019, King Rama X issued a royal edict stripping her of all her government, military, and noble ranks, positions, and titles, as well as royal decorations, citing her conflict with and disrespectful conduct towards his wife, Queen Suthida. Until October 2021, her whereabouts were unknown, rumored to either be in prison or dead.

On 27 August 2020, the Lat Yao Central Women's Correctional Prison was reportedly closed to visitors for two days, and a Boeing 737 plane from King Rama X's private fleet was dispatched to Bangkok. According to journalist Andrew MacGregor Marshall, the prison is where she had been held and the events were part of a plan to transport her in secret to Munich where she would join his retinue in quarantine, in preparation for a possible future royal pardon and restoration of her titles. 

On 29 August 2020, the restoration was made official with a royal edict stating that she had "never been a tarnished person" and proclaiming that all her titles, decorations and military ranks are fully restored as if they had never been revoked.

Titles, styles, honours, and military ranks
All of her titles, honours, and military ranks were stripped by King Vajiralongkorn on 21 October 2019 and reinstated on 2 September 2020.

Titles and styles

 26 January 1985 – December 2014: Miss Niramon Ounprom
 December 2014 – 28 July 2019: Phan Ek ("Colonel") Sineenat Wongvajirapakdi
 30 April 2019 – 24 May 2019: Than Phu Ying ("High Lady") Phan Ek ("Colonel") Sineenat Wongvajirapakdi
 24 May 2019 – 28 July 2019: Than Phu Ying ("High Lady") Phon Tri ("Major General") Sineenat Wongvajirapakdi
 28 July 2019 – present: Chao Khun Phra ("Royal Noble Consort") Sineenat Bilaskalayani

Honours
 17 August 2017: Dame Commander (Second Class) of The Most Exalted Order of the White Elephant (KCE)
 3 May 2019: Dame Grand Cordon (Special Class) of The Most Exalted Order of the White Elephant (KGE)
 30 April 2019: Dame Grand Cross (First Class) of The Most Illustrious Order of Chula Chom Klao (GCC)
 3 May 2019: Dame Grand Cordon (Special Class) of The Most Noble Order of the Crown of Thailand (KGCT)
 30 April 2019: Royal Cypher Medal of King Rama X, First Class (VPR1)

Military ranks
  1 October 2008 – 31 October 2010: Second Lieutenant
  1 November 2010 – 31 August 2015: First Lieutenant
  1 September 2015 – 30 December 2016: Major
  31 December 2016 – 23 May 2019: Colonel
  24 May 2019 – present: Major-General

References
 

1985 births
Living people
Concubines
Consorts of Vajiralongkorn
Mahidol family
People from Nan province
Royal Thai Army generals
21st-century Chakri dynasty

Dames Grand Cross of the Order of Chula Chom Klao
Thai nurses